Igreja de Santa Maria  (English: Church of Santa Maria) is a church in Sintra, Portugal. It has been classified as a National Monument since 1922 and is part of the Cultural Landscape of Sintra, a World Heritage Site since 1995. The church, with three naves, represents the transition between Romanesque and Gothic of the mid-12th century.

References

Churches in Lisbon District
National monuments in Lisbon District
Sintra